Something that is composed of one repeating subunit, the antonym of heteromeric. It is often used to describe proteins made up of multiple identical repeating polypeptide chains e.g. beta galactosidase.

References